Cernusco Lombardone is a comune (municipality) in the Province of Lecco in the Italian region Lombardy, located about  northeast of Milan and about  south of Lecco.

Cernusco Lombardone borders the following municipalities: Merate, Montevecchia, Osnago. It is served by Cernusco-Merate railway station.

Demographic evolution

References

External links
 www.comune.cernuscolombardone.lc.it/

Cities and towns in Lombardy